Gander—Twillingate was a federal electoral district in Newfoundland and Labrador, Canada, that was represented in the House of Commons of Canada from 1968 to 1988.

This riding was created in 1966 from parts of Bonavista—Twillingate and Grand Falls—White Bay—Labrador ridings.

It was abolished in 1987 when it was redistributed into Bonavista—Trinity—Conception and Gander—Grand Falls ridings.

It initially consisted of the provincial districts of Gander, Lewisporte, Twillingate, Fogo and Bonavista North, and the parts of the provincial districts of Green Bay, Bonavista South and Fortune Bay not included in the electoral districts of Grand Falls White Bay-Labrador, Bonavista-Trinity-Conception and Burin-Burgeo.

Members of Parliament

This riding elected the following Members of Parliament:

Election results

See also 

 List of Canadian federal electoral districts
 Past Canadian electoral districts

External links 
 Riding history for Gander—Twillingate (1966–1987) from the Library of Parliament

Former federal electoral districts of Newfoundland and Labrador